Víctor René Mendieta Sánchez (born 6 September 1982) is a football striker who currently plays in Panama for team Bagoso FC.

Club career
He started his career at Alianza, before moving abroad to play for Colombian side Deportes Quindío in December 2004. He returned to Panama after one season to play for San Francisco but made another move to Colombia when he signed for La Equidad. He then played for home side Árabe Unido before crossing borders again for a spell in Costa Rica with Santacruceña and later in Mexico with UANL Tigres Reserve team.

In January 2011, Mendieta joined Tauro from Árabe Unido, then moved to Chorrillo and he was included in Plaza Amador's squad for the 2012 Apertura season.

He joined Chepo in summer 2013.

International career
Mendieta made his debut for Panama in a February 2003 UNCAF Nations Cup match against El Salvador and has earned a total of 4 caps, scoring 1 goal. He represented his country at the 2003 UNCAF Nations Cup.

His final international was a June 2003 friendly match against Cuba.

International goals
Scores and results list Panama's goal tally first.

Personal life
Mendieta is the son of former Panamanian international footballer Víctor René Mendieta Ocampo.

Honors

Club
Liga Panameña de Fútbol (1): 2008 (C)
'''Liga Panameña de Fútbol: Apertura 2009 II
ANAPROF (1): 2006

References

External links

1982 births
Living people
Sportspeople from Panama City
Panamanian footballers
Panama international footballers
2003 UNCAF Nations Cup players
Alianza Panama players
Deportes Quindío footballers
San Francisco F.C. players
La Equidad footballers
C.D. Árabe Unido players
Tauro F.C. players
Unión Deportivo Universitario players
C.D. Plaza Amador players
Chepo FC players
Liga MX players
Categoría Primera A players
Panamanian expatriate footballers
Expatriate footballers in Colombia
Expatriate footballers in Costa Rica
Expatriate footballers in Mexico
Panamanian expatriate sportspeople in Colombia
Panamanian expatriate sportspeople in Mexico
Association football forwards